Połaniec  is a town in Staszów County, Świętokrzyskie Voivodeship, Poland, with  8,406 inhabitants (2012). The town is in Lesser Poland, and its history dates back to the early days of Polish statehood. It lies in the western part of the Sandomierz Basin, a few kilometres north of the Vistula, along the National Road Nr. 79, from Bytom to Warsaw. The town has a railway station serving a secondary line, nr. 75 from Rytwiany to Połaniec.

The Połaniec Power Station, is one of the largest (1800 MW) coal-fired power plants in Poland and, since 2012, one of the largest biomass plants in the world. It is located outside the town, in the nearby village of Zawada.

History

The history of Połaniec dates back to the 11th century, when a gord was built near the spot where the Czarna flows into the Vistula. A settlement emerged in the 11th–12th centuries, with St. Catherine church in the vicinity of the gord. In 1241 Połaniec was completely destroyed in the Mongol invasion of Poland, and near the local village of Tursko a battle took place with the invaders. Połaniec recovered, gaining town rights before 1264, and by 1340, it had some 400 residents. Ten years later, in 1350, King Kazimierz Wielki ordered the town to move from its location on the Winna Góra hill to its present location. In the late Middle Ages, Połaniec was an important trade centre, located along the merchant route from Kraków to Sandomierz, and near the very important waterway, the Vistula. Until 1795 the town belonged to Lesser Poland's Sandomierz Voivodeship.

At the beginning of the 16th century, Połaniec was burned to the ground by the Crimean Tatars, so that King Zygmunt Stary lowered the residents' taxes. In 1526 the town was once again in a conflagration. In the mid-16th century, a town hall, funded by hetman Jan Tarnowski was erected in Połaniec. At the beginning of the 17th century, a hospital was built. In 1772 (see Partitions of Poland), Połaniec suddenly became a border town, when the Austrian province of Galicia was created. Establishing a border along the Vistula slowed economic development in Połaniec. In 1794 the town was one of centres of the Kościuszko Uprising: it was the scene of the Proclamation of Połaniec on 7 May 1794. In 1795 the town was annexed by the Austrian Empire, and in 1815 it became part of Russian-controlled Congress Poland. On 1 June 1869, as a punishment for the January Uprising, it lost its town privileges. At that time, its population was around 2,000. While in the Kielce Voivodeship during the Second Polish Republic Połaniec suffered badly in the 1934 floods. Połaniec had a large Jewish population, who were murdered in the Holocaust by Germans.

In the 1970s, the Tadeusz Kościuszko Power Plant was built, and in 1980, Połaniec regained its town rights.

Demography 
According to the 2011 Poland census, there were 8,227 people residing in Połaniec, of whom 49.6% were male and 50.4% were female. In the town, the population was distributed such that 18.6% under the age of 18, 40.9% from 18 to 44, 31.8% from 45 to 64, and 8.7% who were 65 or older.
 Figure 1. Population pyramid of town in 2010 – by age group and sex

International relations

Twin towns – sister cities
Połaniec is twinned with:

 Étoile-sur-Rhône, France (2004)
 Šalčininkai, Lithuania (2001)
 Stará Ľubovňa, Slovakia (1999)
 Svaliava, Ukraine (2005)
 Viggiano, Italy (2001)
 Vonitsa, Greece (2001)

References

External links
Polish official population figures 2006

Cities and towns in Świętokrzyskie Voivodeship
Staszów County
Sandomierz Voivodeship
Radom Governorate
Kielce Voivodeship (1919–1939)
Holocaust locations in Poland